Telogia is an unincorporated community in Liberty County, Florida, United States. Telogia has a post office with ZIP code 32360.

References

Unincorporated communities in Liberty County, Florida
Unincorporated communities in Florida